Marc Webb (born 23 February 1979) is an Australian rules football coach in the West Australian Football League (WAFL). He played in the Victorian Football League (VFL) for Port Melbourne and in the WAFL for Perth and Subiaco. He serves as an assistant coach at the Western Bulldogs after previously being a premiership winning senior coach for Claremont and serving as an assistant coach for Fremantle. He's the husband of Fremantle AFL Women's player Lisa Webb.

Playing career
Webb played six matches for Port Melbourne in the VFL during the 2000 season. He moved to Western Australia to play for Perth. After playing 20 matches for the Demons, he transferred to Subiaco during the 2002 WAFL season. Between 2002 and 2010 he played 176 matches for Subiaco, including four premierships. He was the Simpson Medal-winner in the 2006 WAFL Grand Final.

Coaching career
In 2011 he entered coaching, serving as an assistant coach at Subiaco. He was appointed head coach of Claremont before the 2012 WAFL season and led the Tigers to a premiership in his first year.  In October 2013 he joined Fremantle in the Australian Football League as a development coach. In 2016 he was appointed as midfield coach. In 2021 he joined the coaching staff of the Western Bulldogs as midfield coach.

References

Living people
1979 births
Australian rules footballers from Victoria (Australia)
Place of birth missing (living people)
Subiaco Football Club players
Perth Football Club players
Port Melbourne Football Club players
Claremont Football Club coaches